The Streekmuseum Goeree-Overflakkee (English: Regional Museum of Goeree-Overflakkee) is established in seven small houses dating back to the seventeenth century, in the old village of Sommelsdijk in the Netherlands. The buildings are inter-connected.

The museum is subdivided into nineteen sections and there is an annually changing exhibition. All aspects of life and work on the island of Goeree-Overflakkee are shown in a well-ordered way. The museum collection dates back to the first century A.D. The visitor will find a complete dwelling, grocery shop and school classroom A.D. 1900. The sections fishery and agriculture give an impression of the principal means of living in the past.

People may also take a glance at the workshops of a blacksmith, a cartwright, a clogmaker and a shoemaker. A photo-collection serves as a reminder of the ‘Watersnoodramp’, the disastrous flood of 1953, when hundreds of islanders were drowned.

References

External links
 Official website in Dutch

Local museums in the Netherlands
Museums in South Holland